For lists of Croatia national under-21 football team results see:

 Croatia national under-21 football team results (1992–1999)
 Croatia national under-21 football team results (2000–2009)
 Croatia national under-21 football team results (2010–2019)
 Croatia national under-21 football team results (2020–present)

results